= Fortieth term for President of the United States =

Fortieth term for President of the United States may refer to:

- The Fourth term and death (1945) of Franklin D. Roosevelt
- The First term (1945–1949) of Harry S. Truman
